Nordøyan is an archipelago and fishing village in Nærøysund, Trøndelag, Norway.

History 
In 1893, a pier was constructed.

Geography 
The village consists of three large islets Heimværet, Oddholmen, Surnøya and several smaller islets.

Nordøyan Lighthouse is located in the village. The lighthouse is located on Surnøya.

References 

Archipelagoes of Norway
Fishing communities in Norway